Lans-Naik Tejbir Bura was a Nepalese army officer, mountaineer and a gold medalist in mixed alpinism, as he was recognized during the 1924 Winter Olympics for his participation in the 1922 British Mount Everest expedition. He worked as a NCO of the Nepalese Army, which was called the Gurkha Army at that time. Tejbir was promoted to become an officer in the British India Army, a position in which he achieved the military rank of Naik, which in India is equal to the rank of Corporal.  

Tejbir Bura was part of the 1922 British Mount Everest expedition, an attempt to climb Mount Everest, which was led by Charles Granville Bruce. The father of the Modern Olympics, Pierre de Coubertin stated that an Olympic medal should be awarded to the Mount Everest climbers who were part of the 1922 Mount Everest expedition. The athletes who were part of that expedition received gold medals at the 1924 Winter Olympics, although they are not considered in the medal tallies of the International Olympic Committee. Tejbir Bura was the first Nepalese to win an Olympic medal, and he is still regarded as the only gold medalist for Nepal in its Olympic history, despite that his medal isn't recognised as official according to the rules of the IOC.

See also 
 Nepal at the Olympics

References

External links 
 Profile at Sports-Reference.com

Gurkhas
Nepalese mountain climbers